Chehel Sotoun (literally: “Forty Columns”) is a Persian pavilion in the middle of a park at the far end of a long pool, in Isfahan, Iran, built by Shah Abbas II to be used for his entertainment and receptions. In this palace, Shah Abbas II and his successors would receive dignitaries and ambassadors, either on the terrace or in one of the stately reception halls.

The name, meaning "Forty Columns" in Persian, was inspired by the twenty slender wooden columns supporting the entrance pavilion, which, when reflected in the waters of the fountain, is said to appear to be forty.

As with Ali Qapu, the palace contains many frescoes and paintings on ceramic. Many of the ceramic panels have been dispersed and are now in the possession of major museums in the west. They depict specific historical scenes such as the infamous Battle of Chaldiran against the Ottoman Sultan Selim I, the reception of an Uzbek King in 1646, when the palace had just been completed; the welcome extended to the Mughal Emperor, Humayun who took refuge in Iran in 1544; the battle of Taher-Abad in 1510 where the Safavid Shah Ismail I vanquished and killed the Uzbek King. A more recent painting depicts Nader Shah's victory against the Indian Army at Karnal in 1739. There are also less historical, but even more aesthetic compositions in the traditional miniature style which celebrate the joy of life and love.

The Chehel Sotoun Palace is among the 9 Iranian Gardens which are collectively registered as one of the Iran’s 23 registered World Heritage Sites under the name of the Persian Garden.

Architecture 
The architecture of this palace is a combination of Chinese, Iranian and French architecture. The building consists of a main (large) porch with 38 meters long, 17 meters wide and 14 meters high, which made it face East. The columns of this octagonal porch are from sycamore and pine wood. And the middle four pillars are located on four stone valves.

Chehel Sotoun's famous pool is in front of the palace which in addition to being beautiful, makes the air soft. On the four sides of the pool there are statues that do not belong to the Chehel Sotoun Mansion. After destruction of the covered palace they moved these statues to the pool of Chehel Sotoun. According to some historians, this mansion suffered a terrible fire in the late Safavid period and parts of it burned.

The porch of Chehel Sotoun consists of two parts. One section is based on an 18 tall wooden pillars; and the other part, which is a little higher, forms the entrance of the hall and in some sources they called it "The mirror hall".

In general, in the historic Chehel Sotoun Mansion, the combined designs of the walls and ceiling of the hall, which are placed in beautiful forms of Lachak Toranj (corner and medallion), and the main lines of the building divisions, which are a beautiful combination of painting, tiling and other various decorations, make this work one of the best examples of Persian architecture during the Safavid era. At present, the mansion operates as a museum; and it's central hall displays some works of art from different periods of Iran.

Notes

Bibliography
 M. Ferrante: ‘Čihil Sutūn: Etudes, relevés, restauration’, Travaux de restauration de monuments historiques en Iran, ed. G. Zander (Rome, 1968), pp. 293–322
 E. Grube: ‘Wall Paintings in the Seventeenth Century Monuments of Isfahan’, Studies on Isfahan, ed. R. Holod, 2 vols, Iran. Stud., vii (1974), pp. 511–42
 S. Babaie: ‘Shah ‛Abbas II, the Conquest of Qandahar, the Chihil Sutun, and its Wall Paintings’, Muqarnas, xi (1994), pp. 125–42

External links

 
 More Pictures, Tishineh
 "About Chehel Sotoun" Irpersiatour

Palaces in Iran
Persian gardens in Iran
Buildings and structures in Isfahan
Safavid architecture
Buildings and structures completed in 1646
Persian words and phrases
Tourist attractions in Isfahan
World Heritage Sites in Iran
Safavid court
National works of Iran